Burglars at Work is a 1904 French short crime film directed by Gaston Velle for Pathé Films.

References

External links
 

1904 films
French silent short films
French crime films
1900s crime films
Articles containing video clips
French black-and-white films
Films directed by Gaston Velle
1900s French films